The anterior border of the superior pubic ramus presents a sharp margin, the obturator crest, which forms part of the circumference of the obturator foramen superiorly and affords attachment to the obturator membrane.

The obturator crest extends from the pubic tubercle to the acetabular notch.

References

Bones of the pelvis
Pubis (bone)